Adam Neumann (born April 25, 1979) is an Israeli-American billionaire businessman and investor. In 2010, he co-founded WeWork with Miguel McKelvey, where he served as CEO from 2010 to 2019. In 2019, he co-founded a family office dubbed 166 2nd Financial Services with his wife, Rebekah Neumann, to manage their personal wealth, investing over a billion dollars in real estate and venture startups.

Following mounting pressure from investors based on disclosures made in a public offering filing, Neumann resigned as CEO of WeWork and gave up majority voting control . Forbes estimated his net worth to be around US$1.1 billion .

Biography
Adam Neumann was born in 1979 in Beersheba, Israel. His parents divorced when he was seven, and he lived in 13 different homes by the time he was 22. He suffers from dyslexia and could not read or write until he was in third grade. In his teens, he lived on a kibbutz in southern Israel. He served as an officer in the Israeli Navy. He later attended the Zicklin School of Business at Baruch College in New York City.

Neumann married Rebekah Neumann in 2008. He lives in the Greenwich Village neighborhood of New York City with his wife and their six children. Neumann's sister, Adi Neumann, is a model and former Miss Teen Israel.

In 2018, Neumann gave a keynote speech at an event held by UJA-Federation of New York where he spoke of observing Shabbat with his family every week and the role Judaism has played in his personal and professional growth.

The Wall Street Journal reported in 2019 that Neumann had aspirations to live forever, become the world's first trillionaire, expand WeWork to the planet Mars, become Israel's prime minister, and become "president of the world". A September 2019 Vanity Fair article reported that Neumann made claims that he convinced Rahm Emanuel to run for the presidency of the United States, used JPMorgan Chase's CEO Jamie Dimon as his personal banker, convinced Saudi prince Mohammed bin Salman to improve the standing of women in Saudi Arabia, and claimed to be working with Jared Kushner on the Trump administration's peace plan for the Israeli–Palestinian conflict.

Business career
Prior to founding WeWork, Neumann founded a children's clothing company, Krawlers. Neumann and Miguel McKelvey began working together, having met through a mutual friend, on Green Desk in 2008, a shared-workspace business focusing on sustainability, the precursor to WeWork. The pair sold their interest in Green Desk and using the funds along with a $15 million investment from Brooklyn real estate developer Joel Schreiber for a 33% interest in the company, they founded WeWork in 2010. Neumann stated that with WeWork, he intended to replicate the feeling of togetherness and belonging he felt in Israel and that he thought was lacking in the West.

According to The Wall Street Journal, Neumann chartered a Gulfstream G650 for a trip from the United States to Israel during the summer of 2018.  Neumann and his friends spent much of the flight smoking marijuana.  After landing in Israel, the flight crew found a cereal box stuffed with marijuana and reported it to the jet owner.  Fearing a marijuana trafficking incident, the jet's owner ordered it to return to the US.  Neumann and his friends had to book a separate flight back.

On September 22, 2019, there were reports, from outlets such as The Wall Street Journal, that various WeWork directors were planning on asking Neumann to step down as CEO, after "a tumultuous week in which his eccentric behavior and drug use came to light" before a planned IPO. The Wall Street Journal reported that he had taken $700 million out of WeWork before the IPO, among other details, and "undermined his position" at the company. Neumann also directed We Holdings LLC (a company managed by Neumann and McKelvey) to unwind the transaction of $5.9 million in stock that the company paid in exchange for the "We" trademarks. On September 24, 2019, he resigned and Artie Minson and Sebastian Gunningham were named as successors.

In October 2019, The Wall Street Journal reported that Neumann would receive close to $1.7 billion from stakeholder SoftBank for stepping down from WeWork's board and severing most of his ties to the company. Weeks later, minority shareholders filed a lawsuit against Neumann and other WeWork officials for breach of its fiduciary duties. On February 24, 2021, The Wall Street Journal reported that Neumann had received about $130 million of the $185 million in consulting fees agreed to be paid by SoftBank before SoftBank ceased making the remainder of the payments to him. On May 27, 2021, the Wall Street Journal reported the terms of a renegotiated severance package between Neumann and SoftBank, replacing that from October 2019. Among other terms, Neumann received $106 million in cash in addition to the $92.5 million in consulting fees previously received (in contrast to the $130 million figure reported by the WSJ on February 24, 2021, for previously received consulting fees from SoftBank), with about $50 million of that to pay for his legal fees. The renegotiated settlement package also "let him refinance $432 million in debt on favorable terms and allowed an entity Mr. Neumann controls to sell $578 million in WeWork stock." The Wall Street Journal also reported that Neumann received a new WeWork stock award of "roughly $245 million," but "if the price [of WeWork] falls below $10 [per share], Mr. Neumann is ineligible to receive the stock award." The May 2021, securities disclosure filings were made "as WeWork completes a merger with BowX Acquisition, a special-purpose acquisition company."

In January 2021 Neumann retained top defamation lawyer Tom Clare to defend his reputation.

On 5 March 2021, Forbes listed his net worth at US$750 million, having dropped off the Forbes billionaires list in 2020.

As of March 2022, Neumann has shifted focus to property investing in Miami.  In August, it was announced that Andreessen Horowitz had invested in Neumann's new residential real-estate company, Flow. At the time of the announcement, the company said its expected launch was in 2023. Marc Andreessen, one of the founders of Andreessen Horowitz, signaled in a memo that Flow may make efforts to create more equity in the housing market by helping renters eventually own the unit they are renting. Andreessen has long been outspoken about housing market inequity in the U.S. and his belief in the need to build more housing, but the announcement of his investment in Flow came less than two weeks after it was revealed that he strongly opposed a multifamily housing project in his neighborhood.

In May 2022, Neumann was reported as being behind Flowcarbon, a start-up tokenizing carbon credit trading platform that runs on blockchain.

Investments
In 2018, Neumann became a partner of InterCure, an Israeli cannabis company led by Ehud Barak, former Prime Minister of Israel and invested in EquityBee, a start-up for tech investors, and Selina, a hospitality company. In early 2020, Neumann invested US$10 million into multimodal shared mobility company GOTO Global, taking a 33% equity stake in the company.

Property 
In 2012, Neumann partnered with Ken Horn of Alchemy Properties and Joel Schreiber and purchased for US$68 million the top floors of the Woolworth Building, which they then converted into condominiums.

As CEO, Neumann on multiple occasions purchased buildings and then leased the space back to WeWork. Observers noted this as a potential conflict of interest and one that would not be allowed if WeWork were a public company. During his tenure as CEO of WeWork, Neumann also purchased US$90 million worth of residences, including a  estate in Westchester County, New York, a  condominium near Gramercy Park, two homes in The Hamptons, and a US$21 million mansion in Corte Madera, California.

Neumann has begun purchasing apartment buildings and, as of early 2022, owned some 4,000 apartments worth about US$1 billion, primarily located in the American South.

In popular culture 
Neumann is a main focus of the nonfiction book Billion Dollar Loser (2020). In the Apple TV+ series WeCrashed (2022), Neumann is portrayed by Jared Leto.

Generation Hustle 
The HBO docuseries Generation Hustle, which profiles American scammers, produced an episode titled "Cult of WeWork" about the Neumanns leadership at WeWork. The characterization of the show as being about scammers caused the Neumanns to pursue legal action against HBO. As a result HBO changed their characterization and removed its true crime listing. According to Deadline Hollywood, this was the only episode in the ten-part series where "the subject matter hasn't been charged or accused of breaking an actual law or, in many cases, served time."

See also
 List of Israelis by net worth
 List of Jewish American businesspeople

References

External links

1979 births
Living people
20th-century American Jews
Baruch College alumni
American billionaires
Israeli Ashkenazi Jews
Israeli company founders
People with dyslexia
WeWork people
21st-century American Jews